Mikhail Timofeyevich Yefremov (– 19 March 2000), was a Soviet politician and diplomat.

In 1931 he graduated from the Samara Electro-Technical School and went on to work in the Chief Inspectorate of the Samara Energy Plant from 19311933. After serving in the Red Army from 19331934, he studied at the Kuybyshev Industrial Institute from 19381941.

From 1943 to 1951 he served in various positions of the Kuybyshev Regional Committee of the All-Union Communist Party (bolsheviks), and served as First Secretary of the same Committee from October 1952 to December 1959.

From 1959 until 1965 he served in various positions of the CPSU when from 13 November 1965 he became Deputy Chairman of the Council of Ministers, a position he held under 29 October 1971.

In 1971 he was accorded the diplomatic rank of Ambassador Extraordinary and Plenipotentiary, and his first diplomatic posting came when he was presented his Letter of Credence in East Berlin on 30 October 1971 as the Ambassador of the Soviet Union to East Germany. He was Ambassador to East Germany until 7 March 1975, when on 10 March 1975 he began his next posting as Ambassador of the Soviet Union to Austria. He served as Soviet ambassador in Vienna until his retirement on 26 October 1986.

References

1911 births
2000 deaths
People from Samara Oblast
Ambassadors of the Soviet Union to Austria
Ambassadors of the Soviet Union to East Germany
Central Committee of the Communist Party of the Soviet Union members
Fourth convocation members of the Supreme Soviet of the Soviet Union
Fifth convocation members of the Supreme Soviet of the Soviet Union
Sixth convocation members of the Supreme Soviet of the Soviet Union
Seventh convocation members of the Supreme Soviet of the Soviet Union
Eighth convocation members of the Supreme Soviet of the Soviet Union
Recipients of the Order of Friendship of Peoples
Recipients of the Order of Lenin
Recipients of the Order of the Red Banner of Labour
Recipients of the Order of the Red Star
Russian politicians
First Secretaries of the Gorky Regional Committee of the CPSU
Burials at Kuntsevo Cemetery